A leadership election was held by the People's Justice Party (PKR) in Malaysia in 2018 to elect a new leader. 

Anwar Ibrahim, who had been recently pardoned and released from his prison sentence following that year's general elections, was elected as party president uncontested, replacing his wife Wan Azizah Wan Ismail. The post for the deputy president was contested between Rafizi Ramli and Azmin Ali, and the party's supporters were separated into two camps, the Azmin camp and the Rafizi Camp. Azmin was elected as deputy president in a tightly-contested competition with Rafizi, but elections for the post was not without controversy, as there were instances of violence and alleged sabotages during the party's pollings.

Nominations & Results

President

Deputy President

Vice president

Women's Chief

Women's Deputy Chief

Angkatan Muda KeADILan Chief

Angkatan Muda KeADILan Deputy Chief

References

 Malaysiakini page

2018 elections in Malaysia
People's Justice Party leadership election
People's Justice Party leadership elections